Seneca Historic District is a historic district in Seneca, South Carolina, United States, that is listed on the National Register of Historic Places.

Description 
The district is located south of the railroad tracks in Seneca. The district consists of a number of homes and three churches that were built in the late nineteenth and early twentieth centuries. The houses have architectural styles that were popular in the period. It also includes a log cabin from the mid nineteenth century that was moved from Long Creek, South Carolina.

It was listed on the National Register of Historic Places December 31, 1974. Its boundaries were expanded April 23, 1987.

A map of the district is available.

See also

 National Register of Historic Places listings in Oconee County, South Carolina

References

External links

Historic districts on the National Register of Historic Places in South Carolina
Buildings and structures in Oconee County, South Carolina
National Register of Historic Places in Oconee County, South Carolina
Seneca, South Carolina